"Simply Irresistible" is the first single released by English rock singer Robert Palmer from the 1988 studio album Heavy Nova.

In 1988, the song reached No. 2 on the Billboard Hot 100 singles chart, being denied the top spot for two weeks by Guns N' Roses' "Sweet Child o' Mine."  It was No. 1 on the Billboard Hot Mainstream Rock Tracks chart for three weeks. It also earned Palmer his second Grammy Award the following year, and the song was nominated for the Brit Award for Best British Single.

Cash Box called it a "hard charging power-guitar fueled rocker."

Music video
The music video was directed by British fashion photographer Terence Donovan and shows Palmer surrounded by numerous women, all with the same heavy makeup and sweptback hair style. The video features women that Palmer met while visiting the Kentucky Derby (Karen Aubrey McElfresh, Kim Jones and Cheryl Day).

Charts

Weekly charts

Year-end charts

References

External links
Simply Irresistible at Discogs

How to make a Robert Palmer Girl costume and make up

Robert Palmer (singer) songs
1988 singles
1989 singles
Number-one singles in Australia
Grammy Award for Best Male Rock Vocal Performance
Songs written by Robert Palmer (singer)
1987 songs
EMI Records singles
Manhattan Records singles